Hydrogenophaga bisanensis is a Gram-negative, non-spore-forming, rod-shaped bacterium from the Comamonadaceae family, which was isolated from wastewater from a textile dye works in Korea. Colonies of H. bisanensis are moderate yellow in color.

References

External links
Type strain of Hydrogenophaga bisanensis at BacDive -  the Bacterial Diversity Metadatabase

Comamonadaceae
Bacteria described in 2008